The Karate competition of the 2011 Pan American Games in Guadalajara, Mexico were held at the San Rafael Gymnasium between October 27 and October 29. All the competitions was held in the kumite discipline.

Medal summary

Medal table

Men's events

Women's events

Schedule
All times are Central Daylight Time (UTC-5).

Qualification

Each nation is allowed enter a maximum of ten athletes (one per weight category). Mexico as host nation receives an entry in each weight category, while all other nations had to qualify through four qualifying tournaments.

References 

 
2011 in karate
Events at the 2011 Pan American Games
2011